Erikub Atoll (Marshallese:) is an uninhabited coral atoll of fourteen islands in the Pacific Ocean, located in the Ratak Chain of the Marshall Islands. It is located slightly south of Wotje.

History
The first recorded sighting of Erikub Atoll by Europeans was on 29 June 1566 by the Spanish galleon San Jerónimo then commanded by pilot Lope Martín. However, it is likely that it had already been previously sighted by the Spanish expedition of Ruy López de Villalobos between December 1542 and January 1543. Lope Martín, who had been pilot of the patache San Lucas on its voyage from New Spain to the Philippines the previous year, had on this occasion mutinied with a gang of twenty six sailors and soldiers and murdered the San Jerónimo's captain, Pero Sánchez Pericón. The conspirators, including Martín, were later marooned on the Namonuito Atoll.

Erikub Atoll was claimed by the German Empire along with the rest of the Marshall Islands in 1884. After World War I, the island came under the South Seas Mandate of the Empire of Japan. The base became part of the vast US Naval Base Marshall Islands. Following the end of World War II, Erikub came under the control of the United States as part of the Trust Territory of the Pacific Islands. The island has been part of the independent Republic of the Marshall Islands since 1986.

Ecology
Loj island, within the atoll, is a nesting site of the green turtle.

See also
 Desert island
 List of islands

References

External links

Atolls of the Marshall Islands
Ratak Chain
Uninhabited islands of the Marshall Islands